Vasili Valentinovich Ilik (born 5 November 2001) is a Russian football player who plays for FC SKA-Khabarovsk.

Club career
He made his debut in the Russian Football National League for FC SKA-Khabarovsk on 1 August 2020 in a game against Alania Vladikavkaz, he substituted Daniil Ivankov in the 89th minute.

References

External links
 
 Profile by Russian Football National League
 

2001 births
Sportspeople from Khabarovsk Krai
People from Imeni Lazo District
Living people
Russian footballers
Association football defenders
FC SKA-Khabarovsk players
Russian First League players
Russian Second League players